Valentina Dimitrova Radinska (Bulgarian: Валентина Димитрова Радинска) (born 1951 in Slivеn) is a Bulgarian poet.

Life 
She studied at the Sofia University, and graduated from the Maxim Gorky Literature Institute with an MA.
She was an editor at Bulgarian Cinematography.
She teaches at Sofia University.

She was married to theater director Krikor Azaryan.

Works
"All Soul's Day"
"Gently"
Kum men vurvi chovek (A man walks toward me), 1977
Noshtna Kniga (Night book), 1983
Ne: Stikhotvoreniia, Kni-vo " Georgi Bakalov", 1988
Chistilishte (Purgatory), Izdatelska kushta "Niagolova", 1992, 
Vsichko: Stikhotvoreniia (Everything), Izdatelska kushta "Ivan Vazov", 1995, 
Dimcho Debelianov i Povelitelia na vultsite, Iadatelska kushta "P.K. IAvorov", 1997,

Anthologies

References

20th-century Bulgarian poets
1951 births
Writers from Sliven
Academic staff of Sofia University
Living people
20th-century Bulgarian women writers
20th-century Bulgarian writers
21st-century Bulgarian women writers
21st-century Bulgarian writers
Bulgarian women poets